The Dundalk International is a greyhound racing competition held annually at Dundalk Stadium in Dundalk, County Louth, Ireland.

It was held at the Dundalk Ramparts Greyhound Stadium from 1968 until 2000 until the track closed in 2000 and then it returned in 2004 after the new track was built.

It is a prestigious event and is invitation only, attracting some of Ireland's leading greyhounds and occasionally some of the Britain's leading greyhounds. The event is one of the richest one-off races in Ireland (€20,000 in 2022) and is an integral part of the Irish greyhound racing calendar after being inaugurated in 1968.

Past winners

Venues & distances
1968–1999 (Dundalk Ramparts Stadium 525y)
2004–present (Dundalk Stadium 550y)

Sponsors
2012–2013 (Boylesports)
2014–2014 (Matthews Coaches Hire)
2017–2017 (Racing Post)
2015–2016, 2018 (Marshes Shopping Centre)
2019–2019 (EOS IT Solutions)

References

Greyhound racing competitions in Ireland
Sport in Dundalk
Sport in County Louth
Recurring sporting events established in 1968